Riverside is a city in Montgomery County, Ohio, United States. A suburb of Dayton, The population was 25,201 at the 2010 census. It is part of the Dayton Metropolitan Statistical Area.

Geography
Riverside is located at  (39.778858, -84.123094).

In 1994, Riverside merged with the surrounding Mad River Township. This merger resulted in the creation of several separated sections of the city in parts of the township that had experienced annexations by Dayton, Huber Heights, and Wright-Patterson Air Force Base. There are a total of six disconnected sections of the city. The southernmost section comprises four smaller sections that are attached solely by annexed roadways and not surrounding properties.

The city is adjacent to Dayton, Kettering, Huber Heights, Wright-Patterson and a small section of Harrison Township in Montgomery County. The city of Beavercreek, Bath Township and Beavercreek Township in Greene County border Riverside on the east.

Demographics

2010 census
As of the census of 2010, there were 25,201 people, 10,284 households, and 6,696 families living in the city. The racial makeup of the city was 87.2% White, 6.6% African American, 0.3% Native American, 1.9% Asian, 1.1% from other races, and 2.8% from two or more races. Hispanic or Latino of any race were 3.3% of the population.

There were 10,284 households, of which 33.5% had children under the age of 18 living with them, 44.2% were married couples living together, 15.0% had a female householder with no husband present, 5.9% had a male householder with no wife present, and 34.9% were non-families. 28.9% of all households were made up of individuals, and 10.6% had someone living alone who was 65 years of age or older. The average household size was 2.45 and the average family size was 3.01.

The median age in the city was 34.8 years. 24.7% of residents were under the age of 18; 10.9% were between the ages of 18 and 24; 26.8% were from 25 to 44; 23.8% were from 45 to 64; and 13.8% were 65 years of age or older. The gender makeup of the city was 48.5% male and 51.5% female.

2000 census
As of the census of 2000, there were 23,545 people, 9,768 households, and 6,427 families living in the city. The population density was 2,996.6 people per square mile (1,156.6/km). There were 10,289 housing units at an average density of 1,309.5 per square mile (505.4/km). The racial makeup of the city was 91.45% White, 4.26% African American, 0.21% Native American, 1.76% Asian, 0.05% Pacific Islander, 0.61% from other races, and 1.66% from two or more races. Hispanic or Latino of any race were 1.55% of the population.

There were 9,768 households, out of which 28.3% had children under the age of 18 living with them, 49.3% were married couples living together, 12.2% had a female householder with no husband present, and 34.2% were non-families. 27.9% of all households were made up of individuals, and 10.1% had someone living alone who was 65 years of age or older. The average household size was 2.41 and the average family size was 2.95.

In the city, the population was spread out, with 23.5% under the age of 18, 10.3% from 18 to 24, 28.4% from 25 to 44, 23.0% from 45 to 64, and 14.9% who were 65 years of age or older. The median age was 37 years. For every 100 females, there were 94.5 males. For every 100 females age 18 and over, there were 91.6 males.

The median income for a household in the city was $37,034, and the median income for a family was $43,650. Males had a median income of $33,987 versus $23,525 for females. The per capita income for the city was $18,702. About 6.7% of families and 10.1% of the population were below the poverty line, including 12.4% of those under age 18 and 10.6% of those age 65 or over.

Notable people
 Charles Michael Davis, actor, best known for  role on The CW television drama, The Originals
 Joe Greene, two time Olympic bronze medalist long jumper

Surrounding communities

References

External links
 City website
 Mad River Local Schools
 Riverside Chamber of Commerce

Cities in Montgomery County, Ohio
Wright-Patterson Air Force Base
Populated places established in 1995
Cities in Ohio